Taji District is a district of the Baghdad Governorate, Iraq.

Districts of Baghdad Province